The 2013–14 season was F.C. Motagua's 63rd season in existence and the club's 48th consecutive season in the top fight of Honduran football.  The domestic league was divided into two tournaments, Apertura and Clausura.  The Apertura was scheduled to be played in the second half of 2013, while the Clausura in the first half of 2014.  Motagua were looking for its 13th domestic championship.  Due to an unsuccessful 2012–13 season, the club won't have international participation.

Overview
Right after being eliminated from the 2012–13 season, one of the club's director, Nelson Abdalah, announced that manager Juan Castillo would continue coaching for this season, nevertheless, on 20 May 2013, president Pedro Atala announced Serbian Risto Vidaković as the new club's manager.  On 18 September 2013, the club released their new anthem called "Mi Corazón" (My Heart) interpreted by Luis Bustillo.  On 6 November, Vidaković was sacked due to poor results and former player Milton Reyes took over.

Players

Transfers in

Transfers out

Squad
 Statistics as of 20 April 2014

Reserve Team Squad
 Statistics as of 2 December 2013

Results

Preseason and friendlies

Apertura

Clausura

External links
 Official website

References

F.C. Motagua seasons
Motagua
Motagua